Marian Więckowski (8 September 1933 – 17 July 2020) was a Polish racing cyclist. He won the Tour de Pologne in 1954, 1955 and 1956.

References

External links
 

1933 births
2020 deaths
Polish male cyclists
Cyclists from Warsaw